The Acrocephalus warblers are small, insectivorous passerine birds belonging to the genus Acrocephalus. Formerly in the paraphyletic Old World warbler assemblage, they are now separated as the namesake of the marsh and tree warbler family Acrocephalidae. They are sometimes called marsh warblers or reed warblers, but this invites confusion with marsh warbler and reed warbler proper, especially in North America, where it is common to use lower case for bird species.

These are rather drab brownish warblers usually associated with marshes or other wetlands. Some are streaked, others plain. Many species breeding in temperate regions are migratory.

This genus has heavily diversified into many species throughout islands across the tropical Pacific. This in turn has led to many of the resulting insular endemic species to become endangered. Several of these species (including all but one of the species endemic to the Marianas and two endemic to French Polynesia) have already gone extinct.

The most enigmatic species of the genus, the large-billed reed warbler (A. orinus), was rediscovered in Thailand in March, 2006; it was found also in a remote corner of Afghanistan in the summer of 2009. Prior to these recent sightings, it had been found only once before, in 1867.

Many species have a flat head profile, which gives rise to the group's scientific name. The genus name Acrocephalus is from Ancient Greek akros, "highest", and kephale, "head". It is possible that Naumann and Naumann thought akros meant "sharp-pointed".

List of species in taxonomic order

The genus contains 42 species of which 6 insular forms are now extinct:
 Basra reed warbler, Acrocephalus griseldis
 Cape Verde warbler, Acrocephalus brevipennis
 Greater swamp warbler, Acrocephalus rufescens
 Lesser swamp warbler, Acrocephalus gracilirostris
 Madagascar swamp warbler, Acrocephalus newtoni
 Seychelles warbler, Acrocephalus sechellensis
 Rodrigues warbler, Acrocephalus rodericanus
 Great reed warbler, Acrocephalus arundinaceus
 Oriental reed warbler, Acrocephalus orientalis
 Clamorous reed warbler, Acrocephalus stentoreus
 Australian reed warbler, Acrocephalus australis
 Millerbird, Acrocephalus familiaris
† Nightingale reed warbler, Acrocephalus luscinius
 Saipan reed warbler, Acrocephalus hiwae
† Aguiguan reed warbler, Acrocephalus nijoi
† Pagan reed warbler, Acrocephalus yamashinae
† Mangareva reed warbler, Acrocephalus astrolabii
 Nauru reed warbler, Acrocephalus rehsei
 Caroline reed warbler, Acrocephalus syrinx
 Bokikokiko, Acrocephalus aequinoctialis
 Northern Marquesan reed warbler, Acrocephalus percernis
 Tahiti reed warbler, Acrocephalus caffer
† Moorea reed warbler, Acrocephalus longirostris
† Garrett's reed warbler, Acrocephalus musae
 Southern Marquesan reed warbler, Acrocephalus mendanae
 Tuamotu reed warbler, Acrocephalus atyphus
 Cook reed warbler, Acrocephalus kerearako
 Rimatara reed warbler, Acrocephalus rimatarae
 Henderson reed warbler, Acrocephalus taiti
 Pitcairn reed warbler, Acrocephalus vaughani
 Black-browed reed warbler, Acrocephalus bistrigiceps
 Moustached warbler, Acrocephalus melanopogon
 Aquatic warbler, Acrocephalus paludicola
 Sedge warbler, Acrocephalus schoenobaenus
 Speckled reed warbler, Acrocephalus sorghophilus
 Blunt-winged warbler, Acrocephalus concinens
 Manchurian reed warbler, Acrocephalus tangorum (sometimes included in A. agricola)
 Large-billed reed warbler, Acrocephalus orinus
 Paddyfield warbler, Acrocephalus agricola
 Blyth's reed warbler, Acrocephalus dumetorum
 Common reed warbler, Acrocephalus scirpaceus
 Marsh warbler, Acrocephalus palustris

Fragmentary fossil remains from the Late Miocene (about 11 mya) of Rudabánya (NE Hungary) show some apomorphies typical of this genus. Given its rather early age (most Passerida genera are not known until the Pliocene), it is not too certain that it is correctly placed here, but it is highly likely to belong to the Acrocephalidae at the least.

References

Further reading

External links

Acrocephalus videos  on the Internet Bird Collection

 
Bird genera
Taxa named by Johann Andreas Naumann
Taxa named by Johann Friedrich Naumann